Leander is a Capital MetroRail commuter rail station and park and ride in Leander, Texas.  The park and ride portion of it, designed by McKinney York Architects, was built in 2007 and is located on Highway 183 just north of FM 2243 and is the northern terminus of the Red Line. Leander is one of two stations located within Williamson County alongside Lakeline as opposed to Travis County which contains the other seven locations. Leander Station includes a park and ride with 600 spaces. With Lakeline serving as a midday and Saturday terminus for many trains in service, Leander is only serviced by the Red Line during weekday rush hours and late Friday nights.

Bus connections
 #985 Leander/Lakeline Direct
 #987 Leander/Lakeline Express

References

External links
 Leander station overview (Capital Metro)
 Leander station from 183 from Google Maps Street View

Capital MetroRail stations
Railway stations in the United States opened in 2010
Leander, Texas
Railway stations in Williamson County, Texas
2010 establishments in Texas